Mark Stewart (born 28 April 1960) is an English singer and founding member of The Pop Group. A pioneer of post-punk and industrial hip-hop, he has recorded for On-U Sound Records and Mute Records.

Career 
Stewart was educated at Bristol Grammar School, one of Bristol's leading public schools, and was in the same year as fellow musician Nick Sheppard. Stewart began his music career in 1977 as a founder of The Pop Group, a band whose sonic experimentation, political conviction, and willingness to collaborate laid the foundations for his later work.

The Pop Group split in 1981, with Stewart and two other members heading off to London to hook up with the emerging On-U Sound "conspiracy of outsiders" as part of the New Age Steppers. On-U became a focal point of a diverse set of networks – punks, reggae players from both the UK and Jamaica and free-jazzers. His first post-Pop Group release was as 'Mouth 2', the 1982 single "Who's Hot". Two releases followed with On-U associates under the name 'Mark Stewart & The Maffia' – the Jerusalem EP in 1983, and the 1983 album Learning to Cope with Cowardice.

Stewart has since made several albums under his own name as well as collaborating with artists such as Trent Reznor of Nine Inch Nails fame, Tricky, Massive Attack, Chicks on Speed, ADULT. and Primal Scream. In 2005, he released a collection of his best work on Soul Jazz Records entitled Kiss the Future.

Stewart is well known in several European countries and Japan. He was involved in a documentary filmed by Tøni Schifer, "On/Off – Mark Stewart – from The Pop Group to the Maffia", which included interviews with Nick Cave, Daniel Miller, former Pop Group members, Adrian Sherwood, Skip McDonald, Doug Wimbish, Keith LeBlanc, Fritz Hart (23 Skidoo) and others. The premiere took place at the East End Film Festival in April 2009.

This track record of anarchic pioneering prompted Nick Cave to declare that Stewart as a member of The Pop Group "changed everything". Reflecting on his far-reaching influence, Mark says, "I thought I was making funk music, but a track on Veneer of Democracy supposedly inspired all the American [Sic] industrialists, like Front Line Assembly and Skinny Puppy, while another track supposedly inspired the Bristol kids. It happens all the time. I've got this nonchalance that nothing is sacred so I'll crash a Slayer guitar line with Rotterdam gabba beats. For me, it's like colours. I grew up doing montages; like I did this collage of Ronald Reagan's head on this gay porno cowboy. In fact, I've never really grown up at all. I'm still trying to put round things into square holes."

In 2011 Stewart collaborated with New York-based artist-writer Rupert Goldsworthy, forming The New Banalists Orchestra, a collective featuring a host of renowned artists and associates, including John Sinclair (poet), Youth (musician), David Tibet, Penny Rimbaud & Eve Libertine. Their sole output to date, entitled "Mammon", was released in 2011.

Stewart released his next solo single through Future Noise Music on Black Friday 25 November 2011. The Double A-side "Children of the Revolution" / "Nothing Is Sacred" features The Bug, Crass's Eve Libertine, Berlin's Slope and Pop Group bassist Dan Catsis. This paved the way for Stewart's 2012 album, The Politics of Envy, released on 26 March 2012, also on Future Noise Music. Tackling mass media, modern capitalism and consumer apathy, it features a cast including Kenneth Anger, Lee 'Scratch' Perry, Richard Hell, The Raincoats' Gina Birch, Primal Scream and Clash/PiL guitarist Keith Levene.

As well as music Stewart has been involved in conceptual art, collaborating once again with Rupert Goldsworthy on a show entitled "I AM THE LAW" displayed at Ritter/Zamet gallery in New York and London from January until March 2012. Dazed described the show as "an expo where found objects, wall paintings and scrawled writings come together in a ritualistic pile-on of references...an effort to explore cultural myths, symbols, signs and 'radical brands' – the power of representation, charged with dystopian views, prison gates and rioting crowds."

Stewart has remained active in a number of other solo projects and collaborations since. 2013 saw him write and contribute vocals to Primal Scream's "Culturecide", a track featured on More Light and in 2014 he produced and provided vocals for "Shame & Pain", a track which featured Thurston Moore and was collected on a Jeffrey Lee Pierce Sessions Project compilation.

The next year saw Stewart remix both "Space Junk" by The Membranes and "Death Trip To Tulsa" by the Mark Lanegan band whilst also providing vocals for "Schizoid Fairytale", a track by Jim Johnston (English musician). A couple of years later in 2017 Stewart wrote several tracks for "London Town", an album released by ex-Sugarhill Gang and regular On-U Sound Records cohort Little Axe.

In 2018, Stewart remixed "Ndrangheta Allotment" by Meatraffle and wrote and featured on the track "Stratosphere Girl" on More Disco Songs About Love, the third LP from Los Angeles duo De Lux. He has also recently featured on the track "Fight Fire With Fire" by Lay Llamas taken from the upcoming Rocket Recordings release "Thuban".

Solo discography 

Learning to Cope with Cowardice (1983)
As the Veneer of Democracy Starts to Fade (1985)
Mark Stewart (1987)
Metatron (1990)
Control Data (1996)
Kiss the Future (2005)
Edit (2008)
The Politics of Envy (2012)
VS (2022)

References

Further reading

External links 
 Mark Stewart Music Official Website

 
Living people
English male singers
Culture in Bristol
People educated at Bristol Grammar School
British post-punk musicians
Musicians from Bristol
Place of birth missing (living people)
On-U Sound Records artists
Mute Records artists
1960 births